Solitude à deux is an album by the French singer Johnny Hallyday.

Track listing
"Elle m'oublie" (Didier Barbelivien)
"Salut Charlie" (Hallyday, Michel Mallory)
"La fille du square" (Pascal Lefèbvre, Franck Langolff)
"Cet homme que voilà" (Paolo Amerigo Cassella, Marco Luberti, Riccardo Cocciantre; French lyrics by Pierre Delanoë)
"Revoilà ma solitude" (Michel Mallory, Kenny Rogers)
"La première pierre" (Michel Mallory, Tim Hinkley)
"Va te cacher" (Michel Mallory, Erick Bamy)
"Lolita" (Michel Mallory, Kim Morrison)
"Un coup pour rien" (Michel Mallory, Erick Bamy)
"Le pétrole" (Michel Mallory)
"Je vous la donne" (John Goodison, Phil Wainman; adapted by Michel Mallory)
Source: Solitude à deux track listing

References

1978 albums
Johnny Hallyday albums
Philips Records albums